Panchavan Kaadu is a 1971 Indian Malayalam-language film, directed and produced by Kunchacko. The film stars Prem Nazir, Sathyan, Sheela and Sharada. The film had musical score by G. Devarajan.

Cast

Prem Nazir as Kochu Kurup, younger brother
Sathyan as Ananda Kurup, elder brother
Sheela as Kochu Thankachi
Sharada as Minnukutty
Ragini as Unniyamma
Hari as Warrior
Adoor Pankajam as Nangeli
Alummoodan as Chindan Pilla
G. K. Pillai as Thanu Pilla
K. P. Ummer as Marthanda Varma
Kottayam Chellappan as Arumukham Pilla
N. Govindankutty as Muthuppayyan
Paravoor Bharathan as Fisherman
Rajamma as Servant
S. P. Pillai as Kannappan
Ushakumari as Devamma
Veeran as Ramayyar
Vijaya Kumari as Naniyachi

Soundtrack
The music was composed by G. Devarajan with lyrics by Vayalar Ramavarma.

References

External links
 

1971 films
1970s Malayalam-language films